Akhtam Khamrakulov (born 30 January 1988 in Qurghonteppa, Soviet Union) is a Tajik footballer who plays for FC Khatlon as a striker.

Career

Club
In January 2014, Khamrakulov signed for Azerbaijan Premier League side AZAL on a 2.5 year contract, however he was released by AZAL at the end of the 2013–14 season.

International
During the 2014 FIFA World Cup qualifiers, Khamrakulov was called up by Tajikistan, scoring his first goal for Tajikistan, against North Korea on 29 February 2012 in their 1–1 draw.

Career statistics

Club

International

Statistics accurate as of match played 13 November 2016

International Goals

References

External links

1988 births
Living people
People from Khatlon Region
Tajikistani footballers
Association football forwards
Tajikistan international footballers
Vakhsh Qurghonteppa players
AZAL PFK players
Footballers at the 2006 Asian Games
Asian Games competitors for Tajikistan
Tajikistan Higher League players